Daniel Nicholson (born 2 November 1990) is an Australian rules footballer who played with the Melbourne Football Club in the Australian Football League (AFL) and their affiliate club, Casey Scorpions in the Victorian Football League.

He made his debut against Carlton in round 10 of the 2011 AFL season. Nicholson started the game as a substitute and was brought on in the third quarter, in place of Matthew Warnock. Nicholson was retained in the side for the following game and was the substitute again. He replaced Colin Sylvia in the second quarter.

Nicholson plays on the half back flank as a rebounding defender and is noted for his legspeed and endurance.

Nicholson was delisted by the Demons at the conclusion of the 2014 season. He played only one senior game in his final year with the club.

He studied sports therapy and injury prevention at university. Now at home town port fairy he leads the seagulls in the hfnl

Statistics

|- style="background-color: #EAEAEA"
! scope="row" style="text-align:center" | 2011
|style="text-align:center;"|
| 49 || 9 || 2 || 1 || 64 || 52 || 116 || 24 || 32 || 0.2 || 0.1 || 7.1 || 5.8 || 12.9 || 2.7 || 3.6
|-
! scope="row" style="text-align:center" | 2012
|style="text-align:center;"|
| 26 || 11 || 0 || 3 || 116 || 87 || 203 || 57 || 27 || 0.0 || 0.3 || 10.5 || 7.9 || 18.5 || 5.2 || 2.5
|- style="background-color: #EAEAEA"
! scope="row" style="text-align:center" | 2013
|style="text-align:center;"|
| 26 || 11 || 2 || 6 || 90 || 65 || 155 || 48 || 38 || 0.2 || 0.5 || 8.2 || 5.9 || 14.1 || 4.4 || 3.5
|-
! scope="row" style="text-align:center" | 2014
|style="text-align:center;"|
| 26 || 1 || 0 || 0 || 4 || 5 || 9 || 4 || 4 || 0.0 || 0.0 || 4.0 || 5.0 || 9.0 || 4.0 || 4.0
|- class="sortbottom"
! colspan=3| Career
! 32
! 4
! 10
! 274
! 209
! 483
! 134
! 101
! 0.1
! 0.3
! 8.6
! 6.5
! 15.1
! 4.2
! 3.2
|}

References

External links

1990 births
Living people
Melbourne Football Club players
Australian rules footballers from Ballarat
Casey Demons players
University Blues Football Club players
East Ballarat Football Club players
Waratah Football Club players
Port Fairy Football Club players
Redan Football Club players